Batsto may refer to:

Batsto River, a tributary of the Mullica River in southern New Jersey
Batsto Village, New Jersey, a New Jersey state historic site
Båtstø, a village in Buskerud, Norway